Van Basty Sousa e Silva (born 27 November 1994), and commonly known as Sousa, is a Brazilian footballer who plays as a midfielder for Brasil de Pelotas of Pelotas, Brazil.

Career
Born in Olivedos, Paraíba, Sousa began playing senior football with Campinense Clube at age 18. He would win the Copa do Nordeste with the club. Next, Van Basty was loaned to Brasília Futebol Clube where he competed in the Copa São Paulo de Futebol Júnior and won the Copa Verde.

He has previously represented Comercial-MS in 2015 Campeonato Brasileiro Série D.

References

External links
 

Living people
1994 births
Brazilian footballers
Association football midfielders
Campinense Clube players
Esporte Clube Comercial (MS) players
Esporte Clube Democrata players
Grêmio Esportivo Brasil players
Mirassol Futebol Clube players
Campeonato Brasileiro Série B players
Campeonato Brasileiro Série C players
Campeonato Brasileiro Série D players